American Football League is a name shared by several leagues, including:

Major leagues
American Football League (1926), also known as AFL I (1926)
American Football League (1936), also known as AFL II (1936–37)
American Football League (1940), also known as AFL III (1940–41)
American Football League, also known as AFL IV (1960–1969), merged with National Football League in 1970
American Football League (Poland), an American football league in Poland

Minor leagues
American Football League (1934), based in American South and Southwest
American Football League (1938), evolved from Midwest Football League
American Football League (1944), outgrowth of the Northwest War Industries League
American Association (American football), changed its name to the American Football League in 1946

See also
List of leagues of American and Canadian football